Austin Traylor (born September 3, 1993) is a former American football tight end. He played college football at the University of Wisconsin.

Early years
Traylor attended Walnut Ridge High School. He accepted a football scholarship from the University of Wisconsin.

Professional career

Dallas Cowboys
Traylor was signed as an undrafted free agent by the Dallas Cowboys after the 2016 NFL Draft on May 17. He was waived on September 3, 2016, and signed to the practice squad the next day. He was released on September 14.

San Diego Chargers
On September 20, 2016, Traylor was signed to the San Diego Chargers' practice squad. He was released on October 4, 2016.

New England Patriots
On November 1, 2016, Traylor was signed to the New England Patriots' practice squad. He was released on November 12, 2016.

Baltimore Ravens
On November 15, 2016, Traylor was signed to the Baltimore Ravens' practice squad, but was released four days later.

Denver Broncos
On December 20, 2016, Traylor was signed to the Denver Broncos' practice squad. He signed a reserve/future contract with the Broncos on January 2, 2017.

On September 2, 2017, Traylor was waived by the Broncos and was signed to the practice squad the next day. He was promoted to the active roster on November 18, 2017.

Salt Lake Stallions (AAF)
In January 2019, Traylor joined the Salt Lake Stallions of the Alliance of American Football. He caught 2 passes for 12 yards in 8 games played, after which the league shut down in April.

Detroit Lions
On July 22, 2019, Traylor signed with the Detroit Lions. He was waived on August 31, 2019.

References

External links
Wisconsin Badgers bio

1993 births
Living people
American football tight ends
Baltimore Ravens players
Dallas Cowboys players
Denver Broncos players
Detroit Lions players
New England Patriots players
Players of American football from Columbus, Ohio
Salt Lake Stallions players
San Diego Chargers players
Wisconsin Badgers football players